Grigorij Khizhnyak (alternate spelling: Grygorii Khizhniak, ; July 16, 1974 – October 5, 2018) was a Ukrainian professional basketball player. He was the EuroLeague's leader in blocked shots in two consecutive seasons, in 2000–01 and 2001–02.

Professional career
Khizhnyak, who was a dominant defensive force in the paint, led the EuroLeague in blocks per game for two consecutive years (2001, 2002), while playing with the Lithuanian League club Žalgiris Kaunas. Among his greatest career achievements, was his participation in the ULEB Cup (EuroCup)'s 2005 Final, while he was a member of the Greek League club Makedonikos.

National team career
Khizhnyak was a regular member of the senior men's Ukrainian national basketball team. With Ukraine, he played at the 1997 EuroBasket, and the 2003 EuroBasket.

Death
Khizhnyak died of a heart attack on 5 October, 2018, at the age of 44.

EuroLeague career statistics

|-
| style="text-align:left;"|2000–01
| style="text-align:left;" rowspan="2"|Žalgiris Kaunas
| 12 || 12 || 29.8 || .539 || .000 || .840 || 7.2 || .8 || .7 || style="background:#CFECEC;"|3.2 || 12.1 || 18.8
|-
| style="text-align:left;"|2001–02
| 14 || 14 || 32.2 || .508 || .333 || .888 || 8.1 || 1.4 || .9 || style="background:#CFECEC;"|3.2 || 14.4 || 21.6
|- class="sortbottom"
| style="text-align:center;" colspan="2"|Career
| 26 || 26 || 31.1 || .520 || .167 || .865 || 7.7 || 1.2 || .8 || 3.2 || 13.3 || 20.3

References

External links
 FIBA Archive Profile
 Euroleague.net Profile
 Spanish League Archive Profile

1974 births
2018 deaths
Sportspeople from Mykolaiv
BC Avtodor Saratov players
BC Azovmash players
BC Budivelnyk players
BC Dnipro players
BC Kyiv players
BC Žalgiris players
Centers (basketball)
BC Dynamo Saint Petersburg players
Liga ACB players
Makedonikos B.C. players
Place of death missing
Peristeri B.C. players
Ukrainian expatriate basketball people in Russia
Ukrainian expatriate basketball people in Lithuania
Ukrainian expatriate basketball people in Spain
Ukrainian expatriate basketball people in Greece
Ukrainian men's basketball players
Valencia Basket players